Theta Sigma Upsilon was a sorority founded on March 25, 1921 at Emporia State University. It merged with 
Alpha Gamma Delta at the 22nd international convention of Alpha Gamma Delta at French Lick, Indiana on June 29, 1959.

History
Theta Sigma Upsilon was founded on March 25, 1921 at Emporia State University. In 1925, the sorority became part of the Association of Education Sororities which it remained a member until the association dissolved when its members became part of the National Panhellenic Conference.

Alpha Gamma Delta absorbed Theta Sigma Upsilon at the 22nd international convention of Alpha Gamma Delta at French Lick, Indiana on June 29, 1959. Thirteen chapters were added to Alpha Gamma Delta from this merger, with these names as their new  chapter designations:
 Alpha Rho-Temple University 
 Alpha Tau-Edinboro University of Pennsylvania 
 Alpha Sigma-Indiana University of Pennsylvania 
 Alpha Upsilon-Central Michigan University 
 Beta Theta-University of Wisconsin- Whitewater 
 Gamma Kappa-Northwestern State University 
 Gamma Lambda-Longwood University 
 Gamma Mu-James Madison University 
 Delta Iota-California State University, Chico 
 Epsilon Kappa-Pittsburg State University 
 Epsilon Iota-University of Northern Colorado 
 Epsilon Lambda-University of Central Missouri 
 Epsilon Mu-Fort Hays State University

Symbols
Their colors are Rose and Silver, their flower is the Pink Rose and their tree is the dogwood. Its Patron was Minerva.

Chapter list
At the time of the 1959 merger, this was the list of Theta Sigma Upsilon chapters:

References

Defunct former members of the National Panhellenic Conference
1921 establishments in Kansas
Organizations disestablished in 1921
Student organizations established in 1921
1959 disestablishments in the United States
Former members of Professional Fraternity Association